Vagabundo is a concept album by Robi Dräco Rosa. It was recorded in Surrey, England under the creative direction of Roxy Music guitarist Phil Manzanera. The music video for "Madre Tierra" was directed by Angela Alvarado and won Best Rock Video in the 1997 Latin Music Awards. The album was also included in Spin Magazine's 1997 Top 10 list of greatest Latin Rock records of all time.

Track listing

 "Hablando del Amor" (Navarro, Rosa) - 1:14 	
 "Madre Tierra" (Escolar, Rosa) - 3:35  	
 "Llanto Subterráneo" (Rosa, Sabines) - 3:52	 	
 "Vagabundo" (Navarro, Rosa) - 3:37 	
 "Penélope" (Navarro, Rosa) - 4:45 	
 "Delirios" (Rosa, Tena) - 3:00 	 	
 "Para No Olvidar" (Rosa, Sabines) - 4:16 	
 "Blanca Mujer" (Escolar, Rosa) - 3:51 	 	
 "Vértigo" (Navarro, Rosa) - 2:43 	
 "Vivir" (Escolar, Rosa) - 4:21 	 	
 "Brujería" (Escolar, Rosa) - 3:28 		
 "La Flor del Frío" (Navarro, Rosa) - 3:55 	
 "Amantes Hasta el Fin" (Navarro, Rosa) - 5:02	
 "Mientras Camino" (Navarro, Rosa) - 0:37

Personnel
 Robi Dräco Rosa - vocals, electric and acoustic guitars, bass, harmonica, piano, sound effects
 Rusty Anderson - electric guitar
 Carla Azar - percussion, drums
 Paul Bushnell - bass
 Phil Manzanera - custom guitar, musical director, record producer
 Geoff Dugmore - drums
 Peter Gordeno - piano, hammond organ, clavinet, mellotron
 Sara Loewenthal - arranger
 Roddy Lorimer - trumpet, flugelhorn, piccolo trumpet
 Ash Howes - mixing engineer
 Charles Rees - assistant engineer
 Chucho Merchán - bass
 Dinah Beamish, Ellen Blair, Chris Eaton and Jos Pook
 Roger Gorman - art director
 Jana Leon - photography
 Draco Rosa - liner notes

Certifications

External links
 Official Madre Tierra Music Video

1996 albums
Concept albums
Alternative metal albums by Puerto Rican artists
Draco Rosa albums
albums produced by Phil Manzanera